Meadowfair is a small neighborhood of San Jose, California, located in East San Jose. It is one Eastside San Jose's historic Chicano/Mexican-American neighborhoods.

Geography
Meadowfair is in District 8 of San Jose and adjacent to Eastridge Mall; its other boundaries are Capitol Expressway and King Road. 

Most of the neighborhood consists of a development of two-story houses, which is shaped like a piano and has street names with a musical theme. Meadowfair Park is located on part of one of the last remaining orchards in the area.

References

Neighborhoods in San Jose, California
Chicano and Mexican neighborhoods in California